The Almanac of American Philanthropy is a reference book published by the nonprofit Philanthropy Roundtable in 2016 to capture the history, purpose, effects, and modern direction of private philanthropy in the United States. Philanthropy in the U.S. is a major part of the economy with $360 billion given every year and 8 billion hours of time volunteered. Philanthropy is a major cultural force in the U.S., handling many social responsibilities, thanks to individual giving levels that are two to twenty times higher than in other comparable nations.

The Almanac records the achievements of American philanthropy, profiles influential donors, presents statistics and polling results, lists books and recommended readings in the field, provides a selection of philanthropy quotations, and summarizes modern approaches to charitable giving in the United States.

Distribution
Three thousand copies of the Almanac were distributed to academic and public libraries and 13,000 copies were sent to donors and U.S. foundations worth at least $50 million. Hard copies of the book are available for sale on Amazon for $25, but its content is also available for free online.

Overview
The Almanac of American Philanthropy chronicles 380 years of private giving in America. Jeff Jacoby of The Boston Globe called the Almanac "the first definitive work on the history, variety, and impact of private giving in the United States." Its sections include:

An introduction that encapsulates philanthropy's influence on American society, addresses common criticisms of philanthropy, and investigates the benefits of charitable giving
 A list of the most significant U.S. living donors of the last 15 years
 A Hall of Fame of great historic donors
 Descriptive entries on more than 900 major achievements in American philanthropy from 1636 to 2015, organized by sectors
 Brief sketches of philanthropic literature, classic and recent, divided into themes
A collection of quotations about giving
 The results of an original 2015 national poll of Americans on topics related to philanthropy. Among other findings, the poll found that 47 percent of Americans chose private charity as their first choice for solving a social problem, compared to 32 percent who chose government
 Charts and graphs with text explanations, depicting data and trends in philanthropy
 An analysis of which demographic and regional groups are America's more generous givers. According to the Almanac, the wealthiest 1% of Americans make one-third of all charitable donations
 An analysis of the U.S. tax treatment of charitable donations
 A timeline of the most significant events in U.S. philanthropy over four centuries of national development

The Orange County Register wrote that the Almanac "shatters myths about the stinginess of the wealthy and bleeding-heart liberals’ monopoly on compassion."  Booklist, published by the American Library Association, reviewed the Almanac this way:  "This comprehensive, current, accurate, well-organized reference on private giving in the U.S. contains sections on our greatest givers, past and present, and major achievements from 1636 to 2015. The volume's very reasonable cost (for 1,300+ pages) enhances the reference value.... Recommended."

Author
Karl Zinsmeister created the Almanac of American Philanthropy for the Philanthropy Roundtable. He has authored eleven books, including works on charter schools and public policy philanthropy, embedded reporting on the Iraq War, and a Marvel Comics nonfiction graphic novel. He has written for publications including the Wall Street Journal, the New York Times, and the Atlantic, and he produced a PBS documentary film.

References

External links

 Amazon entry
Boston Globe review
City Journal review
America Magazine review
Booklist review

Almanacs
2016 non-fiction books
American history books
Philanthropy